Vimaleshwar Temple is located in Rivona village of Sanguem taluka in the state of Goa, India. Vimaleshwar is a form of Shiva and is worshiped in the form of a Shivalinga. It is a "Swayambhu" shivlinga.

The Prabhu Dessai family of Rivona (GSBs) and the Daivajna Brahmins with surname 'Rivonkar' or 'Revankar' are Mahajans of the temple.

Other affiliated deities
 Kamaleshwar
 Mahalakshmi
 Maruti
 Purush
 Ravalnath

Major festivals
 Dasara
 Kalo
 Pindikaotsav
 Shigmo
 Shivratri

See also
Agrashala
Goan temple
Shantadurga Kalangutkarin Temple
Vahanas used in Goan temples
List of Daivajna temples in Goa

Notes

References
Goa: Hindu temples and deities, by Rui Gomes Pereira, Antonio Victor Couto, page 35.

External links
 Goa Temples

Konkani
Shiva temples in Goa
Hindu temples in South Goa district